The Battle of Vatapi was a decisive engagement which took place between the Pallavas and Chalukyas near the Chalukya capital of Vatapi (present day Badami) in 642. The battle resulted in the defeat of the Chalukya king Pulakeshin II in 642 CE and the commencement of Pallava occupation of Vatapi lasted until 654.

Causes 

In about 630, Pulakeshin II invaded the Pallava kingdom defeating the king Mahendravarman I and proceeded as far south as the Cauvery River on the northern frontier of the Chola country. The Pallavas long wished to avenge the humiliation suffered at the hands of Pulakeshin II and over the next few years, strengthened their forces in preparation for a counter-attack.

In 630, Mahendravarman I was succeeded by his son Narasimhavarman I under whom the Pallava kingdom emerged as a powerful state. This prompted Pulakeshin II to lead a second expedition into the Pallava country. According to K. A. Nilakanta Sastri, Pulakeshin II first defeated the Banas, who were feudatories of the Pallavas, before advancing into the Pallava country. Narasimhavarman I met the Chalukyas and defeated them in three separate encounters in Pariyala, Suramana and Manimangala, all close to the Pallava capital Kanchi, forcing them to retreat. The Pallavas, then, took the offensive and pursued the fleeing Chalukya forces deep into their territory.

Events 

In 642, a formidable Pallava force under Paranjothi was sent by Narasimhavarman I to capture Vatapi, the capital of the Chalukyas. Pulakeshin II met the Pallavas on the outskirts of his capital and is presumed to have lost his life in the ensuing battle. The Pallavas achieved a decisive victory over Pulakeshin II. The victorious Pallavas then took the capital and ruled it for 12 years (642-654).

The Kuram plates of Paramesvaravarman I describe the battle thus

The Udayachandramangalam plates state

According to the Velurpalaiyam plates

Aftermath 

Narasimhavarman I constructed a Mallikarjuna Temple at Vatapi to commemorate his victory. He also adopted the title "Vatapi-kondan" or "taker of Vatapi". He carved an inscription recording his victory on the walls of the Teggina-Irappa temple in Vatapi. Paranjothi brought numerous items of war booty to the Pallava kingdom from Vatapai, including a famous icon of the god Ganesha (Ganapati) - known as Vatapi Ganapati, which he enshrined in his home-town.

In Popular Culture
The Battle of Vatapi is the final climactic battle in the Tamil historical fiction novel Sivagamiyin Sapatham by Kalki Krishnamurthy, where the Chalukyan King Pulakeshin II is defeated and killed by the Pallava Army general Pranjothi as a revenge for the defeat of Mahendravarman I in the Battle of Pullalur and also to avenge Sivagami's vow.

References

Bibliography 

 
 

Vatapi
7th century in India
642
History of Karnataka
Pallava dynasty
Chalukya dynasty